DENR may refer to:

DENR (gene), human gene which encodes the density regulated re-initiation and release factor protein
Department of Environment and Natural Resources, Philippines
North Carolina Department of Environmental Quality, formerly the Department of Environment and Natural Resources
Department of Environment and Natural Resources, a predecessor of the Department of Environment, Water and Natural Resources (South Australia)